Sahib Biwi Aur Boss is an India television sitcom, which was premiered on 21 December 2015, and was broadcast on SAB TV. The series was produced by Edit II Productions. which is owned by Benaifer Kohli and Sanjay Kohli. The series aired on every Monday to Friday nights. Mugdha Chaphekar and Vipul Roy play the lead roles.

Plot

The story is about a simple housewife, Anisha, and her husband, Sunny. Sunny wants to become a star, but his dreams are not succeeding in any way, and so, Anisha thought to do the work herself, when she met, Mandodari, as she was looking a wife for her nephew, Vinod (Dhruv Singh (actor)), she choose her, and asked her if she is unmarried, Anisha agreed, but Sunny disagreed, Anisha made Sunny agree, everything was going well, but Vinod saw Anisha and Sunny together, and Anisha told that it was her twin sister, Manisha, and Sunny, changed himself  to an old man, Balma Pandey, to whom Mandodari fall for.
With this they continue their job but also feel fear stricken for their lie. It is shown that Vinod Khana is not a full matured person and has a problem of getting faint for all issues. This problem help Balma Pandey/Sunny to safe guard himself when Vinod tries to find out whether these two are same or not. With several tries of Bua n Bhatija a failure is confronted sue to the loyal wickedness of Sunny for her wife.
A new and hilarious point comes when Balma Pandey  address Bahuri lal (Anisha neighbour) as his father to miss Mandotri and how she tries to be intimate with his old young colleague so that she settle her life with him and sunny tries to safeguard himself and Balma's small pony tail. The story takes a twist when Manndodari finds a letter saying that Balma and Manisha have run and married. Sunny takes Balma's place and Mandodari falls for him.

Cast
 Mugdha Chaphekar as Anisha Kumar/ Manisha Kumar, Sunny's wife (Mandodari's beautiful employee)
 Vipul Roy as Sunny Kumar, Anisha's/ Manisha's husband/ Balma Pandey
 Resham Tipnis as Mandodari, Anisha's boss.
 Dhruv Singh as Vinod Khanna, Mandodari's nephew.
 Feroz (actor) as Dilip Kumar, Sunny's father.
 Supriya Shukla as Shanti Kumar, Sunny's mother.
 Salim Zaidi as Ghamandi Singh
Yogesh Tripathi as Harry/Hari
Ritesh Mobh As Raju The Thief
KK Goswami as Badi Bhaiya/Pahad Singh
Rakesh Bedi as Various characters

See also
 List of Hindi comedy shows

References

External links
 Official website
 

Hindi comedy shows
Hindi language television sitcoms
2015 Indian television series debuts
Hindi-language television shows
Television shows set in Mumbai
Indian comedy television series
Sony SAB original programming